Emile Degelin (16 July 1926 – 20 May 2017) was a Belgian film director and novelist, the director of If the Wind Frightens You His 1963 film Life and Death in Flanders was entered into the 13th Berlin International Film Festival. His 1969 film Palaver was entered into the 6th Moscow International Film Festival. His final film, De ooggetuige, won the audience prize at the Ghent Film Festival in 1995.

He is seen as one of the pioneers and founders of the Belgian film. Degelin died on 20 May 2017 at his home in Kessel-Lo, a borough of Leuven, Belgium.

Selected filmography
 Préhistoire du cinéma (1959)
 Si le vent te fait peur (If the Wind Frightens You) (1960)
 Sirènes (1961)
 La Mort du paysan (1963)
 Life and Death in Flanders (1963)
 Palaver (film) (1969)
 Exit 7 (1978)

References

1926 births
2017 deaths
Belgian film directors
20th-century Belgian novelists
Belgian male novelists
20th-century Belgian male writers